Colin Edward Anderson (12 August 1912 – 10 March 1987) was an Australian sports shooter. He competed in the 100 metre running deer event at the 1956 Summer Olympics.

References

1912 births
1987 deaths
Australian male sport shooters
Olympic shooters of Australia
Shooters at the 1956 Summer Olympics
Sportspeople from Sydney